The Nakajima A4N was a carrier-based fighter used by the Imperial Japanese Navy, and the last biplane designed by Nakajima. The first prototype was completed in 1934, but due to engine trouble the aircraft did not see service until 1936. Given the Nakajima internal designation Nakajima YM, the Japanese Navy designation was Navy Type 95 Carrier Fighter. A total of 221 were built.

Specifications (A4N1)

See also

References

Notes

Bibliography
 

Carrier-based aircraft
Biplanes
A04N, Nakajima
A04N
Single-engined tractor aircraft